The women's foil was one of eight fencing events on the fencing at the 1968 Summer Olympics programme. It was the tenth appearance of the event. The competition was held from 19 to 20 October 1968. 38 fencers from 16 nations competed.

Competition format

The 1968 tournament continued to use a mix of pool play and knockout rounds, but with substantial changes from 1964. The first two rounds were round-robin pool play, followed by a knockout round, finishing with another pool for the final. Barrages were eliminated and the knockout round was a modified double elimination round.

 Round 1: 6 pools, with 6 or 7 fencers in each pool. The top 4 fencers in each pool advanced, cutting the field from 38 to 24.
 Round 2: 4 pools, with 6 fencers per pool. Again, the top 4 fencers advanced, reducing the number of remaining fencers from 24 to 16.
 Knockout round: This was a modified double-elimination tournament. The 16 fencers were divided into 4 groups of 4. The winner of the "winners bracket" in each group advanced to the final pool. The winner of the "losers bracket" from each group faced the winner of a different group's "losers bracket," with the winner of that match advancing to the final pool as well. The knockout round winnowed the fencers from 16 to 6.
 Final round: A final pool with the 6 remaining fencers determined the medals and 4th through 6th place.

Results

Round 1

Round 1 Pool A

Round 1 Pool B

Round 1 Pool C

Round 1 Pool D

Round 1 Pool E

Round 1 Pool F

Round 2

Round 2 Pool A

Round 2 Pool B

Round 2 Pool C

Round 2 Pool D

Double elimination rounds

Winners brackets

Winners group 1

Winners group 2

Winners group 3

Winners group 4

Losers brackets

Losers group 1

Losers group 2

Final round

References

Foil women
1968 in women's fencing
Fen